Microcancilla brasiliensis is a species of sea snail, a marine gastropod mollusk in the family Cancellariidae, the nutmeg snails.

Distribution
This marine species occurs off Brazil.

References

External links
 Recent Cancellariidae. Annotated and illustrated catalogue of Recent Cancellariidae. Privately published, Wiesbaden. 428 pp. [With amendments and corrections taken from Petit R.E. (2012) A critique of, and errata for, Recent Cancellariidae by Jens Hemmen, 2007. Conchologia Ingrata 9: 1-8
 Verhecken, A. (1991). Description of two new species of bathyal Cancellariidae (Mollusca, Gastropoda) from off Brazil. Bulletin du Muséum National d'Histoire Naturelle. ser. 4, section A, 12(3-4): 547-553.
 Souza, L.S. de, Pimenta, A.D. & Miyaji, C. (2021). A new species of Microcancilla from the southwestern Atlantic and notes on Microcancilla brasiliensis comb. nov. (Gastropoda, Cancellariidae). Papeis Avulsos de Zoologia. 61: e20216129

Cancellariidae
Gastropods described in 1991